The Jinan International Open is a professional tennis tournament played on outdoor hardcourts. It is currently part of the ATP Challenger Tour and the ITF Women's Circuit. It is held annually in Jinan, China since 2017.

Past finals

Men's singles

Women's singles

Men's doubles

Women's doubles

External links
 ITF search 

 
ATP Challenger Tour
Hard court tennis tournaments
ITF Women's World Tennis Tour
Tennis tournaments in China
Recurring sporting events established in 2017
2017 establishments in China